Brigidine College is an independent Catholic secondary day school for girls located in St Ives, on the North Shore of Sydney, New South Wales, Australia.

Established in 1954 by the Brigidine Sisters, Brigidine has a non-selective enrolment policy and it caters for approximately 900 students from Year 7 to Year 12. The majority of students are drawn from the Northern Beaches, North Shore and Forest areas of Sydney.

The school is affiliated with the Association of Heads of Independent Schools of Australia (AHISA), the Association of Independent Schools of New South Wales (AIS NSW), the Alliance of Girls' Schools Australasia, and is a member of the Association of Heads of Independent Girls' Schools (AHIGS).

History
The Brigidine Sisters opened Brigidine College, a secondary college for girls, on its current site in St Ives, on 9 February 1954, with nine foundation pupils. The site on which the college was built had previously been an orchard and dairy, and was still surrounded by semi-rural properties.

The Brigidine Sisters remained the administrators and teachers of the College until 1995.

Motto
The Brigidine motto, Fortiter et Suaviter challenges students to be “Women of Strength, Women of Gentleness”. These seemingly opposing virtues are in fact complementary notions of moral courage (fortiter) and consideration of others (suaviter). This motto originates from the foundation of the Brigidine Congregation in Ireland by Bishop Daniel Delany in 1807.

Principals

Campus 
The current facilities of the college include:
Multi-purpose International standard competition court.
The Convent – Administration area, including Reception and Student Services for all Year groups.
McCammon Wing – Year 11 and 12 classroom and recreation areas, Centre for Excellence, Independent Learning Centre, Senior Study Areas, Student Services (including Counsellors and Youth Minister)
Gymnasium – Two classrooms; full sized court for netball, basketball, volleyball; change rooms
Bowie Hall –  A 1,000 seat hall for assemblies, functions and performances
St Brigid's Chapel and Religious Education Centre – Religious Education and Learning Support classrooms and offices; Chapel seating 160 people.
Romuald Visual Arts Centre – A dedicated Visual Arts Centre with senior studio, three classrooms, sculpture courtyard and multi-media area.
McMahon Wing – classrooms and courtyard; Textile and Design areas
Murray Wing – Year 12 Commonroom and courtyard, IT Centre and "Fresh Taste Sensations" Canteen.
Synan Wing – Classrooms for Years 7–9, offices for Year Co-ordinators.
Connolly Wing – Ground Floor: Design and Technology workshops.
Adrian Wing – classrooms
Anita Murray Centre – Performing Arts and Science facilities including 220 seat Theatre, Drama/Dance studio, music classrooms and practice rooms, band rehearsal room, seven new science laboratories and 7 classrooms.
Kinkead Library – Library resources; wide reading area; information laboratory; digital library for staff resources.
College Green – Recreation area for students
Quadrangle – Shaded recreation area

Governance 
In 1999 the College was incorporated as a Company Limited by Guarantee and a board was appointed, with responsibility for governance and leading the College in pursuit of its mission.  The board is appointed by the Trustees of the Sisters of the Brigidine Congregation. Parents are represented on the College Board, as are the Brigidine Sisters and other members of the Catholic educational community. The Principal of the College is appointed by the Board and is charged with the responsibility of administering the College.

Notable alumnae 

Annette Andre – star of 1960s cult British series, Randall and Hopkirk (Deceased)
 Bella Ferraro – X Factor 2012
Lisa Hensley – television and movie actress
Sarah Stephens – model
Alex Hope (songwriter)
Cxloe
 Joanna Oud – model
 Tash Palmer – singer

See also 

 List of non-government schools in New South Wales

References

External links 
 Brigidine website
 The Association of Heads of Independent Girls' Schools
 2014 Annual Report

Educational institutions established in 1954
Catholic secondary schools in Sydney
Girls' schools in New South Wales
Association of Heads of Independent Girls' Schools
1954 establishments in Australia
Brigidine schools
St Ives, New South Wales
Alliance of Girls' Schools Australasia